Stanulus seychellensis, the Seychelle's blenny, is a species of combtooth blenny found in coral reefs in the Pacific and Indian oceans.  This species feeds primarily off of plants, including benthic algae and weeds.  This species can reach a length of  TL.  This fish is also found in the aquarium trade.

References
 Smith, J. L. B. 1959 (May):  Fishes of the families Blenniidae and Salariidae of the western Indian Ocean. Ichthyological Bulletin of the J. L. B. Smith Institute of Ichthyology No. 14: 229-252, Pls. 14-18.

seychellensis
Taxa named by J. L. B. Smith
Fish described in 1959